The Hockey Champ is a 1939 Donald Duck short film, produced in Technicolor and released by Walt Disney Productions.

Plot
Donald Duck is skating on a frozen duck swamp (at one point mocking Sonja Henie, an Olympic figure skater and popular movie star at the time), when he spots his nephews playing ice hockey too roughly. He shows his nephews the moves that won him his ice hockey trophy. But the boys have a few moves of their own, and chaos ensues.

Cast
 Clarence Nash as Donald Duck, Huey, Dewey, and Louie

Home media
The short was released on May 18, 2004, on Walt Disney Treasures: The Chronological Donald, Volume One: 1934-1941.

References

External links
 
 
 

1939 animated films
1939 films
1939 comedy films
1939 short films
1930s sports films
Films directed by Jack King
Films produced by Walt Disney
1930s Disney animated short films
Films scored by Paul Smith (film and television composer)
Donald Duck short films
1930s color films
American ice hockey films
Films with screenplays by Carl Barks